Akashdeep is a 1965 Indian Hindi film.

Akashdeep may also refer to:

 Sheeba Akashdeep, Indian actress
 Akashdeep S Batth (born 1992), Indian Punjabi film director and writer
 Akashdeep Saigal, Indian model and a television actor
 Akashdeep Singh (born 1994), Indian field hockey player
 Akashdeep Singh Kahlon (born 1993), Indian footballer
 Akashdeep, an Indian aerostat developed by the Aerial Delivery Research and Development Establishment